Conus judaeus is a species of sea snail, a marine gastropod mollusk in the family Conidae, the cone snails and their allies.

Like all species within the genus Conus, these snails are predatory and venomous. They are capable of "stinging" humans, therefore live ones should be handled carefully or not at all.

Description
The size of the shell attains 32 mm.

This species is extremely similar to Conus ebraeus. The two are best distinguished by close examination of the radular teeth.

Distribution
This marine species occurs off the Philippines and Papua New Guinea.

References

 Bergh R., Beiträge zur Kenntniss der Coniden; Nova Acta band LXV nr. 2; Halle, 1895 
 Tucker J.K. & Tenorio M.J. (2009) Systematic classification of Recent and fossil conoidean gastropods. Hackenheim: Conchbooks. 296 pp. 
 Puillandre N., Duda T.F., Meyer C., Olivera B.M. & Bouchet P. (2015). One, four or 100 genera? A new classification of the cone snails. Journal of Molluscan Studies. 81: 1-23

External links
 To Encyclopedia of Life
 To World Register of Marine Species
 

judaeus
Gastropods described in 1895